

Roman empire

Poets
 Juvenal, in Latin
 Oppian of Corycus in Cilicia, writing in Greek
 Lucian of Assyria, writing in Greek
 Straton of Sardis, writing in Greek

Persia

Works
 latest likely date for the Drakht-i Asurig, the earliest known Pahlavi poem

China

Poets (by date of birth)
 Cao Cao (155-220), Eastern Han
 Cao Pi  (187-226), Eastern Han
 Cao Zhi (192-232), Eastern Han

 
02
Poetry